Ganesh Shah ( born 12 December 1949) is a Nepalese politician and ex-Minister for Environment, Science and Technology.
He is also one of the senior most leader of the Communist Party of Nepal (United) and until recently was the General Secretary of the party Communist Party of Nepal (United).

Shah is a mechanical engineer by profession and received his M-Tech (Technical Engineering) from Patrice Lumumba Peoples' Friendship University in 1973.

Shah was appointed the Minister for Environment, Science and Technology when Prachanda extended his cabinet.
Mr. Shah is a big advocate of the climate change issues in Nepal and has been quoted in various media outlet during his time as a minister.

Family life
Shah was born in Lohana Dhanusha. He belongs to Nepali people of Madhesi (business caste)ethnicity.

He is married to Kalyanee Sapkota, and has two sons.

References

1949 births
Living people
Government ministers of Nepal
Communist Party of Nepal (United) politicians
Nepalese engineers
Peoples' Friendship University of Russia alumni
Madhesi people
People from Dhanusha District